Shahrestanak (also Romanized as Shahrestānak; also known as Shahrestāneh and Shahristāneh) is a village in Joghatai Rural District, in the Central District of Joghatai County, Razavi Khorasan Province, Iran. At the 2006 census, its population was 2,210, in 547 families.

References 

Populated places in Joghatai County